Muzammil Murtaza (born 12 November 1999), is Pakistani tennis player. He won the silver medal at the 2017 Islamic Solidarity Games as a member of the Pakistani team in a men's team event.

Murtaza has a career high ATP singles ranking of 1,365 achieved on 30 July 2018.

Murtaza has represented Pakistan in Davis Cup, where he has a win-loss record of 0–3.

He participated at the 2018 Asian Games on men's doubles with Muhammad Abid and mixed doubles with Sarah Mahboob Khan.

Davis Cup

Participations: (0–4)

   indicates the outcome of the Davis Cup match followed by the score, date, place of event, the zonal classification and its phase, and the court surface.

References

External links

1999 births
Living people
Pakistani male tennis players
Tennis players at the 2018 Asian Games
Asian Games competitors for Pakistan
Islamic Solidarity Games competitors for Pakistan
Islamic Solidarity Games medalists in tennis
South Asian Games silver medalists for Pakistan
South Asian Games bronze medalists for Pakistan
South Asian Games medalists in tennis
21st-century Pakistani people